Altrose is an aldohexose sugar.  D-Altrose is an unnatural monosaccharide. It is soluble in water and practically insoluble in methanol. However, L-altrose has been isolated from strains of the bacterium Butyrivibrio fibrisolvens.

Altrose is a C-3 epimer of mannose. The ring conformation of α-altropyranoside is flexible compared to most other aldohexopyranosides, with idose as exception. In solution different derivatives of altrose have been shown to occupy both 4C1, OS2 and 1C4-conformations.

References

Aldohexoses